Hieronymus of Cardia (354?–250 BC) was a Greek general and historian from Cardia in Thrace, and a contemporary of Alexander the Great (356–323 BC).

After the death of Alexander he followed the fortunes of his friend and fellow-countryman Eumenes. He was wounded and taken prisoner by Antigonus, who pardoned him and appointed him superintendent of the asphalt beds in the Dead Sea. He was treated with equal friendliness by Antigonus's son Demetrius, who made him polemarch of Thespiae, and by Antigonus Gonatas, at whose court he died at the purported age of 104.

He wrote a history of the Diadochi and their descendants, encompassing the period from the death of Alexander to the war with Pyrrhus (323–272 BC), which is one of the chief authorities used by Diodorus Siculus (xviii.–xx.) and also by Plutarch in his life of Pyrrhus.

He made use of official papers and was careful in his investigation of facts. The simplicity of his style seemingly rendered his work unpopular to people of his time, but modern historians believe it was very good. In the last part of his work he made a praiseworthy attempt to acquaint the Greeks with the character and early history of the Romans. He is reproached by Pausanias (i. 9. 8) with unfairness towards all rulers with the exception of Antigonus Gonatas.

Like the even more famous lost history of Alexander by Ptolemy I of Egypt, no significant amount of his work survived the end of the ancient world. He is among the authors whose fragments were collected in Karl Wilhelm Ludwig Müller's Fragmenta Historicorum Graecorum (II pp. 450–61), and in Felix Jacoby's Die Fragmente der griechischen Historiker (= FGrHist 154).

References
 This work in turn cites:
 Lucian, Macrobii, 22
 Plutarch, Demetrius, 39
 Diod. Sic. xviii. 42. 44. 50, xix. 100
 Dion. Halic. Antiq. Rom. i. 6
 F. Brückner, “De vita et scriptis Hieronymi Cardii” in Zeitschrift für die Alterthumswissenschaft (1842)
 F. Reuss, Hieronymos von Kardia (Berlin, 1876)
 Charles Wachsmuth, Einleitung in das Studium der alten Geschichte (1895)

Bibliography 
J. Hornblower, Hieronymus of Cardia (Oxford: Oxford University Press, 1981).
Joseph Roisman, "Hieronymus of Cardia: Causation and Bias from Alexander to his Successors," in Elizabeth Carney and Daniel Ogden (eds), Philip II and Alexander the Great: Father and Son, Lives and Afterlives (Oxford University Press,).

250 BC deaths
4th-century BC Greek people
3rd-century BC Greek people
3rd-century BC historians
Ancient Greek generals
Ancient Thracian Greeks
Ancient Greek historians known only from secondary sources
Historians who accompanied Alexander the Great
Governors of Antigonus I Monophthalmus